This is a list of articles about scientific journals in biology and its various subfields.

General 

{{columns-list|colwidth=22em|
 Acta Biológica Colombiana
 American Journal of Physical Anthropology
 The American Naturalist
 Annual Review of Physiology
 Asian-Australasian Journal of Bioscience and Biotechnology
 Bioanalysis
 BioEssays Biologia The Biological BulletinBiological Communications Biological Reviews Biology Letters Biology of Reproduction Biometrika Central European Journal of Biology Critical Reviews in Clinical Laboratory Sciences Disease Models & Mechanisms eLife Emu The FASEB Journal Frontiers in Biology International Journal of Biological Sciences International Journal of Biometeorology The Journal of Experimental Biology Journal of Lipid Research Journal of Natural History Journal of Theoretical Biology Nature Protocols Nature Reviews Drug Discovery Oecologia Oikos Open Life Sciences PeerJ PLoS Biology Quarterly Review of Biology Revista Chilena de Historia Natural Revista de Biologia The Scientific World Journal Zeitschrift für Naturforschung Zeitschrift für Naturforschung C}}

AgricultureJournal of Animal ScienceJournal of Dairy ScienceJournal of Food SciencePoultry ScienceAnimal Feed Science and TechnologyJournal of Animal Breeding and GeneticsAnimal ProductionAnimalsanimalAnimal GeneticsAnatomyMicroscopy Research and TechniqueBiochemistry

 Bioengineering 
 Biomedical Microdevices Biotechnology and Bioprocess Engineering Critical Reviews in Biotechnology International Journal of Computational Biology and Drug Design Bioinformatics 

 Biophysics 
 Annual Review of Biophysics and Biomolecular Structure Biophysical Journal FEBS Letters Structure Botany 

 Cell and Molecular 

 Ecology 

 Entomology International Journal of Insect Science Forestry 

 Genetics 

 Healthcare 

 Immunology 
 Annals of Allergy, Asthma & Immunology Molecular Imaging and Biology Nature Immunology Nature Reviews Immunology Microbiology and infectious disease 
 African Journal of Infectious Diseases Annual Review of Microbiology Canadian Journal of Microbiology Microbiology and Molecular Biology Reviews Nature Reviews Microbiology Mycology 

 Neuroscience 

 Nutrition 
 African Journal of Food, Agriculture, Nutrition and Development Applied Physiology, Nutrition, and Metabolism Ornithology 

 Pharmacy 
 Acta Facultatis Pharmaceuticae Universitatis Comenianae''

Virology

Zoology

See also 
 List of scientific journals

External links 
 

 
Biology
Journals
Biology journals